Monetary sovereignty is the power of the state to exercise exclusive legal control over its currency, broadly defined, by exercise of the following powers:
 Legal tender – the exclusive authority to designate the legal tender forms of payment.
 Issuance and retirement – the exclusive authority to control the issuance and retirement of the legal tender.

Incidence of monetary sovereignty
Currently, nations such as the USA and Japan, which have autonomous central banks  exercise monetary sovereignty.  On the other hand, the European Union nations within the Eurozone, have ceded much of their monetary sovereignty to the European Central Bank.

References 

Currency
Monetary reform
Sovereignty
Economic nationalism